Piers Bizony is a science journalist, space historian, author, and exhibition organiser. Bizony specialises in the topics of outer space, special effects, and technology. He has written articles for The Independent, BBC Focus and Wired. His 1997 book The Rivers of Mars was shortlisted for the Eugene M. Emme Astronautical Literature Award. His book 2001: Filming the Future (1994, revised 2000, expanded 2014) is an authoritative reference about Stanley Kubrick's film 2001: A Space Odyssey. His 2017 book Moonshots was inspired by Michael Light's 1999 book Full Moon.

Works
Selected books:

 (Reprinted 2001, Aurum Press.)
 (Reprinted 2001, 2002, Billboard Books.)

 (Reprinted 2006, Thunder's Mouth; 2007, Icon; 2009, Basic Books.)

 — Contains 5 items: 2001: Filming the Future (562-page expanded 3rd ed.), plus 2001: A Space Odyssey [Photos] (100 film stills, 208 p.), 2001: A Space Odyssey Script (facsimile of Kubrick's annotated copy of Clarke's prose treatment "Journey Beyond the Stars: A Film Story", 260 p.), 2001: A Space Odyssey Notes (facsimile of 158 production notes compiled by Victor Lyndon, 320 p.), and 201 Min. of a Space Idiocy (reprint from Mad magazine no. 125, 8 p.). 1500 copies.
 — Contains 1 item: 2001: Filming the Future (562-page expanded 3rd ed.).

References

External links 
 

Living people
Science journalists
1959 births